The men's 10 metre running target team competition at the 2010 Asian Games in Guangzhou, China was held on 16 November at the Aoti Shooting Range.

Schedule
All times are China Standard Time (UTC+08:00)

Records

Results

References

ISSF Results Overview
Results

External links
Official website

Men RT T